was a company engaged in coal mining, railway operation and shipping in Hokkaidō, Japan.

The company was established in 1889 when the state-owned  and Horonai Railway were sold to the company. The company developed coal mines and transported coal to consumers by its own railways and a fleet of steamships.

The railway of the company was nationalized on October 1, 1906 under the Railway Nationalization Act. At this time the company was renamed , which continued mining until 1995 and is in business of coal importing from Russia as of 2014.

Railway

List of lines and stations 
As of September 30, 1906

Muroran – Temiya 
The Muroran–Iwamizawa section and the Iwamizawa–Otaru section are part of the Muroran Main Line and the Hakodate Main Line respectively today. The remaining Otaru–Temiya section became the Temiya Line, which was closed in 1985.

Iwamizawa – Utashinai 
The Iwamizawa–Sunagawa section is the part of the Hakodate Main Line today. The remaining part became the Utashinai Line, which was closed in 1988.

Iwamizawa – Ikushunbetsu 
This section later became a part of the Horonai Line, which was closed in 1987.

Horonaibuto – Horonai 
This section later became a part of the Horonai Line, which was closed in 1987.

Oiwake – Yūbari 
The section from Oiwake to Shin-Yubari (Momijiyama) is a part of the Sekishō Line (Main section) today while the remainder became the Yubari Branch Line which closed in 2019.

Sunagawa – Sorachigawa 
The company leased this section to Japanese Government Railways. This section is a part of the Hakodate Main Line today.

Nationalization 
As the Railway Nationalization Act was promulgated, on October 1, 1906, the company's railway (207 miles 51 chains), rolling stock (1,940), steamship (1), personnel (3,673) and other goods and contracts were transferred to the government of Japan, in exchange of 30,997,100 yen worth of government bond.

References

External links 
 Hokkaido Colliery & Steamship Co., Ltd. 

Coal companies of Japan
Economic history of Japan
Defunct railway companies of Japan
Rail transport in Hokkaido
Railway companies established in 1889
Railway companies disestablished in 1906
Japanese companies established in 1889